The women's doubles of the 2008 ECM Prague Open tournament was played on clay in Prague, Czech Republic.

Petra Cetkovská and Andrea Hlaváčková were the defending champions, but Cetkovská chose not to participate, and only Hlaváčková competed that year.
Hlaváčková partnered with Lucie Hradecká, and won in the final 1–6, 6–3, 10–6, against Jill Craybas and Michaëlla Krajicek.

Seeds

Draw

Draw

External links
Draw

2008 - Women's Doubles
ECM Prague Open
2008 in Czech women's sport